The 38th Annual American Music Awards were held November 21, 2010, at the Nokia Theatre L.A. Live in Los Angeles, California. The awards recognized the most popular artists and albums from 2010's music list. Nominees were announced on October 12, 2010 by Demi Lovato and Taio Cruz. Justin Bieber was nominated for, and won, four awards, including Artist of the Year. Usher and Eminem both won two awards; the former was nominated for three and the latter, five.

Performers

Presenters

Heidi Klum
Jenny McCarthy
John Legend
Eric Stonestreet
Rico Rodriguez II
Jessica Alba
Agnez Mo
Samuel L. Jackson
Christina Milian
Johnny Weir
Taio Cruz
Nicki Minaj
Trey Songz
Willow Smith
Mandy Moore
Sheryl Crow
Natasha Bedingfield
Kelly Osbourne
Julianne Hough
Keri Hilson
Nathan Fillion
Stana Katic
Mike Posner
Avril Lavigne
The Band Perry
Michael Chiklis
Julie Benz
Lady Antebellum
Ryan Seacrest
Christina Aguilera
Seal

Nominees and winners

Ratings
The ceremony was watched by 11.6 million viewers and received a 4.3 preliminary rating in the 18–49 demographic. At the time, It marked the lowest ratings ever for the ceremony, with competition coming from NBC Sunday Night Football.

References

External links

2010
2010 music awards
2010 awards in the United States
2010 in Los Angeles